Norsk Sprængstofindustri A/S was a Norwegian explosives manufacturer and one of Norway's largest industrial companies.
The company traced its roots to 1865 and was established by the merger of other companies in 1917. It produced dynamite, TNT and other explosives used for mining, industrial and military applications. The company merged with explosives manufacturer Grubernes Sprængstoffabriker and became Dyno Industrier in 1971, and later became Dyno Nobel.

References 

Defunct manufacturing companies of Norway
Explosives manufacturers